And Then You'll Beg is the fourth studio album by Canadian technical death metal band Cryptopsy. It is the first album with guitarist Alex Auburn, and the last album with vocalist Mike DiSalvo and guitarist Jon Levasseur, until Levasseur returned in 2011. "Back to the Worms" was the only track from Ungentle Exhumation that was not re-recorded for the debut album Blasphemy Made Flesh. The album starts with a sample from the movie The Matrix.

Track listing

Personnel

Cryptopsy
 Mike DiSalvolead vocals
 Jon Levasseurguitars
 Alex Auburnguitars, vocals
 Eric Langloisbass guitar
 Flo Mounierdrums, backing vocals

Additional personnel
 Dave Galea – technical adviser
 Graves – mastering
 Louis Legault – engineering assistant
 Pierre Rémillard – production, engineering, mixing
 Francois Quevillon – design, illustration, photography

References

Cryptopsy albums
2000 albums
Century Media Records albums